Jiandi, also with variants 簡易/简易 and 簡逷/简逷, is an important figure in Chinese history and Chinese mythology. She was the second wife of Emperor Ku, who was a descendant of the Yellow Emperor. Jiandi was the mother of Xie (偰), the predynastic founder of the Shang dynasty (Xie's name is also written as 契 whose Mandarin Chinese reflexes are either also Xie or Qi, the latter of which should not be confused with Qi (棄) "abandoned", the birth-name of Houji, son of Ku's first wife Jiang Yuan and predynastic founder of the Zhou dynasty). Her pregnancy miraculously occurred following her swallowing or holding in her bosom the egg of a black bird (玄鳥). Jiandi was said to be of the Yousong clan. Jiandi is mentioned in various sources, including the poems "Eulogy of Shang", in the Shijing, and the "Heavenly Questions" in the Chuci.

Notes

References
Yang, Lihui, et al. (2005). Handbook of Chinese Mythology. New York: Oxford University Press. 

Chinese empresses
Shang dynasty people